In molecular biology, XhoI is a type II restriction enzyme EC that recognise the double-stranded DNA sequence CTCGAG and cleaves after C-1. Type II restriction endonucleases (EC) are components of prokaryotic DNA restriction-modification mechanisms that protect the organism against invading foreign DNA. These site-specific deoxyribonucleases catalyse the endonucleolytic cleavage of DNA to give specific double-stranded fragments with terminal 5'-phosphates.

References

Protein families
Protein domains
Restriction enzymes